Wen yi bao  文艺报 ("Literature and Art Newspaper") is a Chinese-language newspaper about Chinese literature and art, that is published three times a week. It is issued by the China Writers Association and is published by the Xinhua Bookstore ("New China Bookstore") in Beijing. The name of the paper is sometimes written as Wenyi bao or Wenyibao.

English translation
There does not appear to be a standard English translation for this publication, and various translations have been used: e.g. Literary Gazette, China Arts Gazette, China Literature and Art Gazette, etc.

History
Wen yi bao was first issued on 25 September 1949 (the week before the founding of the People's Republic of China. It was suspended between June 1966 and June 1978 (during the Cultural Revolution). Howard Goldblatt (1979) described the impact as follows:

Since 2003 it has been issued three times a week. The editors of the paper have included Mao Dun 茅盾, Ding Ling 丁玲, Feng Xuefeng 冯雪峰, Zhang Guangnian 张光年 and Feng Mu 冯牧.

References

External links
Wen yi bao on Worldcat

Newspapers published in China
Chinese-language newspapers